Slouching Towards Bethlehem is a 1968 collection of essays by Joan Didion that mainly describes her experiences in California during the 1960s. It takes its title from the poem "The Second Coming" by W. B. Yeats. The contents of this book are reprinted in Didion's We Tell Ourselves Stories in Order to Live: Collected Nonfiction (2006).

Collection's origins
According to Nathan Heller in The New Yorker, the book came about this way: "In the spring of 1967, Joan Didion [was ...] engaged to write a regular column for the Saturday Evening Post. [...] At some point, an editor suggested that she had the makings of a collection, so she stacked her columns with past articles she liked (a report from Hawaii, the best of some self-help columns she'd churned out while a junior editor at Vogue), set them in a canny order with a three-paragraph introduction, and sent them off. This was Slouching Towards Bethlehem."

Title essay
The title essay describes Didion's impressions of the Haight-Ashbury district of San Francisco during the neighborhood's heyday as a countercultural center. In contrast to the more utopian image of the milieu promoted by counterculture sympathizers then and now, Didion offers a rather grim portrayal of the goings-on, including an encounter with a pre-school-age child who was given LSD by her parents.

One critic describes the essay as "a devastating depiction of the aimless lives of the disaffected and incoherent young," with Didion positioned as "a cool observer but not a hardhearted one." Another scholar writes that the essay's form mirrors its content; the fragmented structure resonates with the essay's theme of societal fragmentation. In a 2011 interview, Didion discussed her technique of centering herself and her perspective in her non-fiction works like "Slouching Towards Bethlehem": "I thought it was important always for the reader, for me to place myself in the piece so that the reader knew where I was, the reader knew who was talking...At the time I started doing these pieces it was not considered a good thing for writers to put themselves front and center, but I had this strong feeling you had to place yourself there and tell the reader who that was at the other end of the voice."

Didion originally wrote the piece as an assignment for The Saturday Evening Post in 1967.

In her preface to the book, Didion writes, "I went to San Francisco because I had not been able to work in some months, had been paralyzed by the conviction that writing was an irrelevant act, that the world as I had understood it no longer existed. If I was to work again at all, it would be necessary for me to come to terms with disorder."

Contents

I. Life Styles in the Golden Land
"Some Dreamers of the Golden Dream"Appeared first in 1966 in The Saturday Evening Post under the title "How Can I Tell Them There's Nothing Left".
"John Wayne: A Love Song"Appeared first in 1965 in The Saturday Evening Post.
"Where the Kissing Never Stops"Appeared first in 1966 in The New York Times Magazine under the title "Just Folks at a School for Non-Violence".
"Comrade Laski, C.P.U.S.A. (M.-L.)"Appeared first in 1967 in The Saturday Evening Post.
"7000 Romaine, Los Angeles 38"Appeared first in 1967 in The Saturday Evening Post under the title "The Howard Hughes Underground".
"California Dreaming"Appeared first in 1967 in The Saturday Evening Post.
"Marrying Absurd"Appeared first in 1967 in The Saturday Evening Post.
"Slouching Towards Bethlehem"Appeared first on September 23, 1967, in The Saturday Evening Post.

II. Personals
"On Keeping a Notebook"Appeared first in 1966 in Holiday.
"On Self-Respect"Appeared first in 1961 in Vogue under the title "Self-respect: Its Source, Its Power".
"I Can't Get That Monster out of My Mind"Appeared first in 1964 in The American Scholar.
"On Morality"Appeared first in 1965 in The American Scholar under the title "The Insidious Ethic of Conscience".
"On Going Home"Appeared first in 1967 in The Saturday Evening Post.

III. Seven Places of the Mind
"Notes from a Native Daughter"Appeared first in 1965 in Holiday.
"Letter from Paradise, 21° 19' N., 157° 52' W"Appeared first in 1966 in The Saturday Evening Post under the title "Hawaii: Taps Over Pearl Harbor".
"Rock of Ages"Appeared first in 1967 in The Saturday Evening Post.
"The Seacoast of Despair"Appeared first in 1967 in The Saturday Evening Post.
"Guaymas, Sonora"Appeared first in 1965 in Vogue.
"Los Angeles Notebook"A section entitled "The Santa Ana" appeared first in 1967 in The Saturday Evening Post.
"Goodbye to All That"Appeared first in 1967 in The Saturday Evening Post under the title "Farewell to the Enchanted City".

Reception
The book was immediately favorably received; its popularity continued to grow and become a "phenomenon" with a devoted readership in subsequent years.

In The New York Times Book Review, novelist and screenwriter Dan Wakefield wrote, "Didion's first collection of nonfiction writing, Slouching Towards Bethlehem, brings together some of the finest magazine pieces published by anyone in this country in recent years. Now that Truman Capote has pronounced that such work may achieve the stature of 'art,' perhaps it is possible for this collection to be recognized as it should be: not as a better or worse example of what some people call 'mere journalism,' but as a rich display of some of the best prose written today in this country."

References

External links
 Dan Wakefield in The New York Times Book Review on Slouching Towards Bethlehem
 book page on the official website

1968 non-fiction books
American essay collections
Essay collections by Joan Didion
Works originally published in American magazines
Books about the San Francisco Bay Area
Books about California